François De Wagheneire (19 September 1937 – September 2015) was a Belgian cyclist. He competed in three events at the 1956 Summer Olympics.

References

External links
 

1937 births
2015 deaths
Belgian male cyclists
Olympic cyclists of Belgium
Cyclists at the 1956 Summer Olympics
Sportspeople from Ghent
Cyclists from East Flanders